is a Japanese professional baseball pitcher for the Yokohama DeNA BayStars in Japan's Nippon Professional Baseball, where he has played since 2018. He previously played with the Chunichi Dragons from 2011 to 2016.

External links

1989 births
Living people
Baseball people from Saitama Prefecture
Japanese baseball players
Nippon Professional Baseball pitchers
Chunichi Dragons players
Yokohama DeNA BayStars players